Potsdam – Potsdam-Mittelmark II – Teltow-Fläming II is an electoral constituency (German: Wahlkreis) represented in the Bundestag. It elects one member via first-past-the-post voting. Under the current constituency numbering system, it is designated as constituency 61. It is located in western Brandenburg, comprising the city of Potsdam and small parts of the Potsdam-Mittelmark and Teltow-Fläming districts.

Potsdam – Potsdam-Mittelmark II – Teltow-Fläming II was created for the inaugural 1990 federal election after German reunification. Since 2021, it has been represented by the Chancellor of Germany, Olaf Scholz of the Social Democratic Party (SPD).

Geography
Potsdam – Potsdam-Mittelmark II – Teltow-Fläming II is located in western Brandenburg. As of the 2021 federal election, it comprises the independent city of Potsdam as well as the municipalities of Kleinmachnow, Michendorf, Nuthetal, Schwielowsee, Stahnsdorf, and Teltow from the Potsdam-Mittelmark district and the Ludwigsfelde municipality from the Teltow-Fläming district.

History
Potsdam – Potsdam-Mittelmark II – Teltow-Fläming II was created after German reunification in 1990, then known as Potsdam. It acquired its current name in the 2002 election. In the 1990 through 1998 elections, it was constituency 276 in the numbering system. In the 2002 and 2005 elections, it was number 61. In the 2009 election, it was number 62. Since the 2013 election, it has been number 61.

Originally, the constituency comprised the independent city of Potsdam and a few surrounding municipalities in the district of Potsdam-Land (abolished in 1993). It acquired its current configuration in the 2002 election, when it took on many more municipalities from the Potsdam-Mittelmark district and a few from the Teltow-Fläming district. Upon the abolition of the Fahrland Amt ahead of the 2005 election, the former municipality of Seeburg was transferred out of the constituency. At the same time, it gained the former municipalities of Derwitz and Groß Schulzendorf. In the 2009 election, it lost the municipalities of Blankenfelde-Mahlow and Rangsdorf. Because of a growing population in Potsdam itself, it lost the municipality of Großbeeren in the 2017 election and the municipality of Werder (Havel) in the 2021 election.

Members
Due to the dominance of Potsdam, Potsdam – Potsdam-Mittelmark II – Teltow-Fläming II has been a stronghold of the Social Democratic Party (SPD), which won the constituency in every election except in the 2013 CDU landslide.

The constituency was first represented by Emil Schnell (SPD) from 1990 to 2002, followed by Andrea Wicklein from 2002 to 2013. The constituency was won by the Christian Democratic Union (CDU) in the 2013 election, and represented by Katherina Reiche. She resigned in 2015 to become CEO of the Association of Local Utilities (VKU). In the 2017 election, SPD candidate Manja Schüle was elected. She resigned in November 2019 after being appointed to the state government of Brandenburg. Vice-Chancellor and SPD lead candidate Olaf Scholz was elected in 2021.

Election results

2021 election

2017 election

2013 election

2009 election

References

Federal electoral districts in Brandenburg
1990 establishments in Germany
Constituencies established in 1990
Olaf Scholz